Burden of My Heart is a 2011 Finnish documentary film about the surviving victims of the genocide in Rwanda. It was directed by Yves Montand Niyongabo. The documentary was chosen for premiere at the 2011 DOK Leipzig film festival. The documentary also received the Jury Youth Prize and Best Domestic Documentary Award at the Tempo film festival in Finland.

References

External links
 

Finnish documentary films
2011 films
2011 documentary films
Documentary films about the Rwandan genocide
2010s English-language films